East Ham United F.C. was an English football club based in East Ham, Greater London. The club played at the Manorway.

History
During the 1890s, an unrelated club named East Ham Town competed in the South Essex League. During the 1910s, another unrelated club representing East Ham, named East Ham, competed in the Spartan League.

The club was established in 1933 as Storey Athletic after Storey Street School in North Woolwich. In 1955 the club was renamed East Ham United. They played in the London League until joining the Aetolian League in 1962 but after two seasons the league merged into the Greater London League. The club were initially placed in the A Section, and after finishing sixth in the league's first season, were placed in the Premier Division for the 1965–66 season. In 1969–70 the league merged into a single division, with East Ham winning the title. They then left the league, but joined the new Metropolitan–London League when it was formed in 1971 by a merger of the Greater London League and the Metropolitan League, and were placed in Division One. In 1975 the league merged with the Spartan League to form the London Spartan League. with East Ham placed in Division One. They were promoted to the Premier Division after finishing third in 1976–77, a season in which they also reached the quarter-finals of the FA Vase. After a single season in the Premier Division, the club transferred to the Essex Senior League in 1978.

After two good seasons, the club struggled in the Senior League, only finishing in the top ten three times in the next 21 seasons. In 2001 they merged with Barking to form Barking & East Ham United. The merged club folded in 2006 and whilst Barking were reformed, East Ham remained defunct.

Honours
Greater London League
Champions 1969–70

Records
Attendance: 4,250 vs West Ham United, friendly, 15 February 1976

References

Association football clubs established in 1933
Association football clubs disestablished in 2001
Defunct football clubs in England
Defunct football clubs in London
London League (football)
Aetolian League (football)
Greater London League
Metropolitan–London League
Spartan League
Essex Senior Football League
1933 establishments in England
2001 disestablishments in England
East Ham
Sport in the London Borough of Newham
South Essex League